Toguchinsky District is an administrative and municipal district (raion), one of the thirty in Novosibirsk Oblast, Russia. It is located in the east of the oblast. Its administrative center is the town of Toguchin. Population: 60,303 (2010 Census);  The population of Toguchin accounts for 36.3% of the district's total population.

Notable residents 

Mikheil Potskhveria (born 12 August 1975 in Kurundus), Georgian footballer

References

Notes

Sources

Districts of Novosibirsk Oblast